Charles Nichols may refer to:

 Charles Archibald Nichols (1876–1920), politician from the U.S. state of Michigan
 Charles August Nichols (1910–1992), American animator and film director
 Kid Nichols born Charles Augustus Nichols (1869–1953), Major League Baseball pitcher and Hall of Famer
 Charles W. Nichols, American chemist